Folkman may refer to:

People
 Jens Christian Folkman Schaanning, a Norwegian politician
 Jon Folkman, an American mathematician
 Judah Folkman, an American medical scientist
 Roy Folkman, an Israeli politician

Math
 Folkman graph, a type of semi-symmetric graph in graph theory
 Folkman's theorem, a theorem in arithmetic combinatorics and Ramsey theory
 Shapley–Folkman lemma, a result in convex geometry

 Jewish surnames